Paul Sarebresole (May 1875 - October 3, 1911) was an early composer of ragtime music. 

Sarebresole was born in New Orleans, Louisiana. His French ancestors spelled the family name "Sarrebresolles".

His "Roustabout Rag", published in 1897 by Gruenewald, was one of the earliest published ragtime pieces.  It utilized the "three-over-four" rhythm later popularized by Charles L. Johnson. 

Other noted Sarebresole compositions include "Get Your Habits On" from 1898 (which inspired the more popular sequel, "I've Got my Habits On"), "Fire's Out" from 1902,  and "Come Clean" in 1905. 

Paul Sarebresole died at 1357 St Anthony Street in New Orleans at the age of 36 and was buried in St. Louis Cemetery Number 3.

See also
List of ragtime composers

References

External links

  “Paul Sarebresole and New Orleans’ First Rag” by Jack Stewart, Jazz Archivist, May 1997 PDF; article begins on page 12

1875 births
1911 deaths
Ragtime composers
Musicians from New Orleans